The Coriobacteriaceae 
 a family of Actinomycetota. The family Coriobacteriaceae has been shown to increase significantly in the ceca of mice in response to stress.

References

External links
https://web.archive.org/web/20070929125423/http://sn2000.taxonomy.nl/Main/Classification/111679.htm

 
Actinomycetota